Sondre Liseth (born 30 September 1997) is a Norwegian footballer who plays for Haugesund.

Career statistics

Club

References

1997 births
Living people
Norwegian footballers
Association football forwards
Eliteserien players
Norwegian First Division players
Fana IL players
Nest-Sotra Fotball players
Mjøndalen IF players
FK Haugesund players
Footballers from Bergen